John Horsey may refer to:

John Horsey (MP died 1422), MP for Dorset (UK Parliament constituency)
 John Horsey (died 1546), English knight
 John Horsey (died 1564), English knight, son of the above
 John Horsey (died 1827), English nonconformist minister and tutor